The 1982 National Panasonic Open was a women's tennis tournament played on outdoor grass courts at the Milton Tennis Centre in Brisbane, Australia that was part of the Category 4 tier of the 1982 WTA Tour. It was the third edition of the tournament and was held from 15 November through 21 November 1982. Third-seeded Wendy Turnbull won the singles title and earned $22,000 first-prize money.

Finals

Singles
 Wendy Turnbull defeated  Pam Shriver 6–3, 6–1
 It was Turnbull's 1st singles title of the year and the 8th of her career.

Doubles
 Billie Jean King /  Anne Smith defeated  Eva Pfaff /   Claudia Kohde-Kilsch 6–3, 6–4

Prize money

References

External links
 ITF tournament edition details
 Tournament draws

National Panasonic Open
National Panasonic Open
National Panasonic Open
National Panasonic Open
National Panasonic Open, 1982